Dixophlebia is a genus of moths in the subfamily Arctiinae. The genus was erected by Arthur Gardiner Butler in 1876.

Species
 Dixophlebia holophaea Hampson, 1909
 Dixophlebia quadristrigata Walker, 1864

References

External links

Arctiinae